Russian Monument may refer to:

 Russian Monument, Sofia, Bulgaria
 Russian Monument (Liechtenstein)